Mehdi Jean Tahrat born Mehdi Serge Jean (24 January 1990) is an Algerian professional  footballer who plays for Al Gharafa and Algeria national football team. He can play as either a centre-back or a defensive midfielder.

Club career
In July 2014, after playing for Lille's reserve team in the Championnat de France Amateur, Tahrat signed with Championnat National side Paris FC.

In January 2018, he left Angers to join Valenciennes FC on loan for the rest of the season.

International career
In September 2015, Tahrat was called up to the Algeria national team for the first time for a pair of friendlies against Guinea and Senegal.

Career statistics

International

Honours
Algeria
 Africa Cup of Nations: 2019
FIFA Arab Cup: 2021

References

External links
 
 

1990 births
Living people
People from Meudon
Association football defenders
Association football midfielders
Algerian footballers
Algerian expatriate footballers
Algeria international footballers
French sportspeople of Algerian descent
French footballers
French expatriate footballers
Évry FC players
Sainte-Geneviève Sports players
Lille OSC players
Paris FC players
Red Star F.C. players
Angers SCO players
Valenciennes FC players
RC Lens players
Abha Club players
Al-Gharafa SC players
Ligue 1 players
Ligue 2 players
Championnat National players
Saudi Professional League players
Qatar Stars League players
Footballers from Hauts-de-Seine
2019 Africa Cup of Nations players
Expatriate footballers in Saudi Arabia
Expatriate footballers in Qatar
Algerian expatriate sportspeople in Saudi Arabia
Algerian expatriate sportspeople in Qatar
French expatriate sportspeople in Saudi Arabia
French expatriate sportspeople in Qatar
2021 Africa Cup of Nations players